Songadh railway station  is a railway station serving in Bhavnagar district of Gujarat state of India. It is under Bhavnagar railway division of Western Railway Zone of Indian Railways. Passenger, Express and Superfast trains halt here.

Trains 

The following trains halt at Songadh railway station in both directions:

 22935/36 Bandra Terminus–Palitana Express
 12941/42 Parasnath Express
 12971/72 Bandra Terminus–Bhavnagar Terminus Express
 22963/64 Bandra Terminus–Bhavnagar Terminus Weekly Superfast Express
 19579/80 Bhavnagar Terminus–Delhi Sarai Rohilla Link Express

See also
Bhavnagar State Railway

References

Railway stations in Bhavnagar district
Bhavnagar railway division